Susharma (Sanskrit: सुशर्मा) was the 234th Katoch king of Trigarta (present-day Kangra) and cousin brother of Bhanumati. He brutally attacked  Virata, king of Matsya Kingdom because all Pandavas were living in disguise in his kingdom during their final year of exile but was defeated by Bhima. Susharma was responsible for distracting Arjun on day 13 of the Kurukshetra war. On the thirteenth day, Dronacharya formed a chakravyuha so that Yudhishthira will get trapped and killed in there. Arjuna and Krishna knew how to break it so Susharma distracted them and took them to the other side of the chakravyuha. He was killed by Arjun on the final day of the war while the rest of his army was retreating. He is mentioned in Mahabharata

References

Characters in the Mahabharata